Andrew Walter Smith (April 1890 – 1968) was an English professional footballer who played as a centre forward or inside right. He scored 54 goals from 141 appearances in the Football League.

Career
Smith was born in Camberwell, London. He joined Birmingham as an amateur in 1912 and turned professional two years later. Before the First World War interrupted his career, he played two full seasons and was Birmingham's leading goalscorer in each. He made guest appearances for Manchester City during the war. Before League football resumed post-war he moved to West Bromwich Albion for a fee of £100, and helped them to their first (and as of 2016 only) League championship. He scored both goals in the 1920 FA Charity Shield victory against Second Division champions Tottenham Hotspur. In 1923 he moved to Stoke, followed by Wigan Borough and Bournemouth & Boscombe Athletic, but hardly played.

Career statistics
Source:

Honours
 with Birmingham
 club's top scorer: 1913–14, 1914–15
 with West Bromwich Albion
 Football League First Division champions: 1919–20
 FA Charity Shield winners: 1920

References
General

Specific

1890 births
1968 deaths
Footballers from Camberwell
English footballers
Association football forwards
Crosswell's Brewery F.C. players
Birmingham City F.C. players
West Bromwich Albion F.C. players
Stoke City F.C. players
Wigan Borough F.C. players
AFC Bournemouth players
English Football League players
Date of death missing
Place of death missing